YLS may refer to:
 Yale Law School, US
 Lebel-sur-Quévillon Airport, Quebec, Canada, IATA code